Ruth Sylvia Roche, Baroness Fermoy,  (née Gill; 2 October 1908 – 6 July 1993) was a friend and confidante of Queen Elizabeth The Queen Mother and the maternal grandmother of Diana, Princess of Wales. She was one of the Queen Mother's ladies-in-waiting.

Biography
Lady Fermoy was born Ruth Sylvia Gill at Dalhebity House, Bieldside, Aberdeenshire, the daughter of Colonel William Smith Gill and his wife, Ruth (née Littlejohn, daughter of David Littlejohn, DL). She showed early promise as a pianist and studied under Alfred Cortot at the Paris Conservatoire in the 1920s.

Her musical career was cut short when she met the wealthy and much older Maurice Roche, 4th Baron Fermoy. They married on 17 September 1931 at St. Devenick's Church in Bieldside, Aberdeenshire. Lord and Lady Fermoy had three children, including Frances, who would become the mother of Diana, Princess of Wales. 

Lady Fermoy did play the piano in public occasionally after her marriage, most notably with Josef Krips at the Royal Albert Hall in 1950, and with Sir John Barbirolli and the Hallé Orchestra at King's Lynn in 1966. She founded the King's Lynn Festival in 1951 and remained closely involved with the Festival for 25 years, persuading Queen Elizabeth The Queen Mother to become its patron.  She was appointed an Officer of the Order of the British Empire (OBE) in January 1952 for her services as Chairman of the King's Lynn Arts Festival Society.

In 1956, the Queen Mother appointed Lady Fermoy an Extra Woman of the Bedchamber. The Queen Mother, being a widow herself, showed a preference for appointing widows to her household, and four years later Lady Fermoy was promoted to Woman of the Bedchamber, a post she held for the next 33 years.  She was appointed a Commander of the Royal Victorian Order in June 1966, and a Dame Commander of the Royal Victorian Order in June 1979.  

Lady Fermoy was a firm believer in the sanctity of marriage. In 1969, her daughter Frances and John Spencer, Viscount Althorp, divorced after Frances left her husband for Peter Shand Kydd. Lady Fermoy testified against her daughter, which allowed Viscount Althorp to retain custody of their children.

The Queen Mother and Lady Fermoy became confidantes, and it was assumed by many that the two women engineered the match between their grandchildren, Charles, Prince of Wales and Lady Diana Spencer. However, when asked about it, Lady Fermoy remarked: "You can say that if you like – but it simply wouldn't be true". She was also said to have counselled her granddaughter against the marriage, saying: "Darling, you must understand that their sense of humour and their lifestyle are different, and I don't think it will suit you."

Lady Fermoy died at her home at 36 Eaton Square, London, on 6 July 1993, aged 84. It was reported that she was not on speaking terms with Diana when she died.

Ancestry
Lady Fermoy's great-grandmother, Kitty Forbes, was the daughter of Eliza Kewark. Eliza's father, Hakob Kevork or Kevorkian, was Armenian; her Indian mother was probably Muslim. She is variously described in contemporary documents as "a dark-skinned native woman" and "an Armenian woman from Bombay".

Popular culture 
Lady Fermoy is portrayed by Georgie Glen in The Crown.

References

1908 births
1993 deaths
British ladies-in-waiting
People from Aberdeenshire
British people of Armenian descent
British people of Indian descent
Officers of the Order of the British Empire
Dames Commander of the Royal Victorian Order
Irish baronesses
20th-century British women
20th-century British people
Ruth